The 26th Virginia Cavalry Regiment was a cavalry regiment raised in Virginia for service in the Confederate States Army during the American Civil War. It fought mostly in the Shenandoah Valley.

Virginia's 26th Cavalry Regiment was formed in December, 1864, by consolidating the 46th and 47th Battalions Virginia Cavalry. The unit served in W.L. Jackson's Brigade and was active in various conflicts in the Shenandoah Valley. It disbanded during the spring of 1865. Lieutenant Colonel Joseph K. Kesler and Major Henry D. Ruffner were in command.

See also

List of Virginia Civil War units
List of West Virginia Civil War Confederate units

References

Units and formations of the Confederate States Army from Virginia
1864 establishments in Virginia
Military units and formations established in 1864
1865 disestablishments in Virginia
Military units and formations disestablished in 1865